The Botswana Bank Employee's Union (BOBEU) is a trade union affiliate of the Botswana Federation of Trade Unions in Botswana.

References

Botswana Federation of Trade Unions
Finance sector trade unions
Organisations based in Gaborone
Trade unions in Botswana